Allan G. Stauber (born February 7, 1944) is an American bridge player from Palm Beach Gardens, Florida.

Bridge accomplishments

Awards

 Mott-Smith Trophy (1) 1981

Wins

 North American Bridge Championships (7)
 Wernher Open Pairs (2) 1981, 1983 
 Blue Ribbon Pairs (1) 1980 
 Jacoby Open Swiss Teams (1) 1982 
 Mitchell Board-a-Match Teams (1) 1981 
 Reisinger (1) 1984 
 Spingold (1) 1981

Runners-up

 North American Bridge Championships
 Fast Open Pairs (1) 2010 
 Grand National Teams (1) 1979

Notes

External links
 

Living people
American contract bridge players
1944 births
Place of birth missing (living people)
Date of birth missing (living people)
People from Westchester County, New York